A Story Told is an American rock band from Charleston, West Virginia, formed in 2013. Consisting of lead vocalist Alex Chaney, lead guitarist Josh Allen, rhythm guitarist Jason Lieser, and drummer Casey Hardman, the band defines themselves as “emotionally forward pop rock”. Their sound has been influenced by acts such as blink-182, OneRepublic, and Taylor Swift. They released their debut full-length album Keep Watch in March 2016. In October 2017, they released another full-length entitled Good Looks, and followed with American Made in 2021.

Band Members 
 Alex Chaney - vocals, keys
 Josh Allen - guitar
 Jason Lieser - guitar
 Casey Hardman - drums

Discography 
LPs
 Keep Watch (2016)
 Good Looks (2017)
 American Made (2021)

EPs
 What Got Me Here In The First Place (2014)
 Fall Back (2013)

References

External links 
 Official website

Musical groups from West Virginia
American pop rock music groups
Musical groups established in 2013
2013 establishments in West Virginia